Claire Devers (born 20 August 1955, in Paris) is a French film director and screenwriter. She was nominated for the 1987 César Award for Best Debut for directing Noir et Blanc (1986).

Filmography 

Noir et Blanc (1986)
Chimère (1989)
Max et Jérémie (1992)
Les Marins perdus (2003)

References

External links 

1955 births
Living people
Film directors from Paris
French women screenwriters
French screenwriters
French women film directors
Directors of Caméra d'Or winners